Scaeosopha erecta is a species of moth of the family Cosmopterigidaefirst described by Li and Zhang in 2012. It is found in China.

The wingspan is about 13 mm. The forewings are whitish yellow with deep-yellow scales on the basal half and distal half. The hindwings are deep grey.

Etymology
The specific name refers to the tuft of erect scales at three-fifths of the wing length beneath the fold on the forewings and is derived from Latin erectus (meaning erect).

References

Moths described in 2012
Scaeosophinae